Charles Édouard Dutoit  (born 7 October 1936) is a Swiss conductor. He is currently the principal guest conductor for the Saint Petersburg Philharmonia and co-director of the MISA Festival in Shanghai. In 2017, he became the 103rd recipient of the Royal Philharmonic Society Gold Medal Award. Dutoit held previous positions with the London Royal Philharmonic Orchestra, the Philadelphia Orchestra, the Orchestre Symphonique de Montréal, the Tokyo NHK Symphony and the Orchestre National de France. As of 2017, he is conductor emeritus of the Verbier Music Festival Orchestra. He is an honorary member of the Ravel Foundation in France and the Stravinsky Foundation in Switzerland. In December 2017, following allegations of sexual assault, the Boston and San Francisco Symphonies cancelled his engagements. In a statement, Dutoit denied the charges.

Biography
Dutoit was born in Lausanne, Switzerland. He studied there, and graduated from the Conservatoire de musique de Genève, where he won first prize in conducting. Then he went to the Accademia Chigiana in Siena at the invitation of Alceo Galliera. In his younger days, he frequently attended Ernest Ansermet's rehearsals and had a personal acquaintance with him. He also worked with Herbert von Karajan at Lucerne as a member of the festival youth orchestra and studied at Tanglewood.

Dutoit began his professional music career in 1957 as a viola player with various orchestras across Europe and South America. In January 1959, he made his debut as a professional conductor with an orchestra of Radio Lausanne and Martha Argerich. From 1959 he was a guest conductor of the Orchestre de la Suisse Romande and the Lausanne Chamber Orchestra. After this, he was the conductor for Radio Zurich until 1967, when he took over the Bern Symphony Orchestra from Paul Kletzki, where he stayed for 11 years.

While head of the Bern Symphony, he also conducted the National Symphony Orchestra of Mexico from 1973 to 1975, and Sweden's Gothenburg Symphony from 1975 to 1978. Dutoit was principal guest conductor of the Minnesota Orchestra in the early 1980s.

In 1977, Dutoit became the artistic director of the Orchestre Symphonique de Montréal (OSM). In the words of  Glasgow-based music critic Kate Molleson: "A 20-year recording contract with Decca made the MSO the most recorded orchestra in the world, and the best of these recordings — Ravel's La Valse and Daphnis et Chloe, Debussy's La Mer, Stravinsky's French-period ballets — remain unsurpassed."  Reaction to Dutoit joining the Montreal Symphony was positive. Peter G. Davis stated that Dutoit transformed the Montreal Symphony. New York Magazine wrote similarly about Dutoit, adding that he was noted for the championing of new Canadian music. Throughout these years, he called without success for a new symphony concert hall for Montréal. Dutoit resigned from the Montreal Symphony in April 2002, with immediate effect, after the Quebec Musicians Guild complained about what it called Dutoit's "offensive behaviour and complete lack of respect for the musicians". In January 2018, the OSM acknowledged ignoring complaints from musicians of verbal and 'psychological harassment' by Dutoit dating back to the 1990s.  He did not return to the OSM as a guest conductor until 2016, in a concert at the new Maison Symphonique de Montréal.

Dutoit has received more than 40 international awards and distinctions, including two Grammy Awards (United States), several Juno Awards (Canada), the Grand Prix du Président de la République (France), the Prix mondial du disque de Montreux (Switzerland), the Amsterdam Edison Award, the Japan Record Academy Award, and the German Music Critics' Award. He and the OSM made many recordings for the Decca/London label.

Dutoit first conducted the Philadelphia Orchestra in 1980. From 1990 to 1999, he was music director of the orchestra's summer concerts at the Mann Center for the Performing Arts. From 1990 to 2010, he was artistic director and principal conductor of the Philadelphia Orchestra's summer festival in Saratoga Springs, New York. In 1991, he was made an Honorary Citizen of the city of Philadelphia.  In February 2007, Dutoit was named the orchestra's chief conductor and artistic adviser, for a contract of four years, effective September 2008. Following the conclusion of his contract in Philadelphia in 2012, the orchestra named him its conductor laureate, as of the 2012–13 season.

Since 1990, Dutoit has directed the Pacific Music Festival in Japan. From 1991 to 2001, Dutoit was Music Director of the Orchestre National de France, with whom he made a number of recordings and toured extensively. In 1996, he was appointed principal conductor and in 1998 music director of Tokyo's NHK Symphony Orchestra. For the NHK television network, he made a series of documentary films for the young people called "Cities of Music" in Venice, St Petersburg, Tokyo, Buenos Aires (plus Rio de Janeiro and Manhaus), New York, Vienna, Budapest, Leipzig, Dresden, Paris and London. In 1997, he was made an honorary Officer of the Order of Canada. He is also one of a handful of non-Canadian citizens to be a Grand Officer of the Ordre national du Québec.

In April 2007, Dutoit was named principal conductor and artistic director of the Royal Philharmonic Orchestra as of 2009.  In October 2019 he was scheduled to stand down as the RPO's principal conductor and to take the title of Honorary Conductor for Life of the orchestra, but instead he resigned in January 2018.  Between 2009 and 2017, Dutoit also served as the music director of the Verbier Festival Orchestra in Switzerland.  In April 2014, Dutoit received the Lifetime Achievement Award by the International Classical Music Awards. He was also made an honorary member of Fondation Igor Stravinsky in Geneva and Fondation Ravel in Monfort l'Amaury, France.
In September 2018, Dutoit was named principal guest conductor of the St Petersburg Philharmonic, effective May 2019.

In late 2021, Dutoit withdrew from a scheduled subscription concert of the New Japan Philharmonic Orchestra due to his infection with COVID-19.

Personal life
Dutoit shuns publicity and protects his private life from the media. He has been married four times. His first marriage was to Ruth Cury, by whom he has a son, Ivan, who lives in Santa Monica, California, with his family, who in turn has two children: Anne-Sophie and Jean-Sebastian. He was also married to Argentine concert pianist Martha Argerich (with whom he has a daughter, Anne-Catherine) and to Canadian economist Marie-Josée Drouin. He is now married to Canadian violinist Chantal Juillet.

Allegations of sexual assault
In 2017 four women accused Dutoit of sexually assaulting them  between the late 1970s and 2010. The alleged incidents occurred in a variety of places.
One allegation was contested by witnesses. The allegations were made by Paula Rasmussen, mezzo-soprano (1991, Los Angeles); Sylvia McNair, soprano (1985, Minnesota); and Jenny Q. Chai, pianist. A singer with the Philadelphia Orchestra also claimed that Dutoit assaulted her in 2006 in upstate New York and again in 2010 in Philadelphia." A 24-year-old musician with the Civic Orchestra of Chicago alleged that Dutoit forced himself on her in 2006.  In January 2018, a British theatre administrator said that when she was an intern Dutoit sexually assaulted her at Tanglewood 20 years earlier."

In March 2018, the Boston Symphony said that Allan's allegations were "credible" and that three other women "credibly described incidents in the 1980s and 1990s in which they, too, were victims of Dutoit's sexual misconduct.

Other women also claimed assault.

Reaction
In January 2018 Dutoit resigned from his position as artistic director and principal conductor of the Royal Philharmonic Orchestra. Several other orchestras either cancelled engagements or severed ties with him, including the Boston Symphony Orchestra, the San Francisco Symphony, the New York Philharmonic, the Philadelphia Orchestra (which also removed his title of conductor laureate), the Sydney Symphony Orchestra, and the Chicago Symphony Orchestra.

The same month, Canadian CBC Radio/CBC Radio Two adopted a policy of no longer crediting Dutoit as conductor when it played his recordings.

Orchestras with which Dutoit has recorded

 
 London Philharmonic Orchestra (LPO) DGG – Philips – Decca
 Royal Philharmonic Orchestra (RPO) DGG – Decca – Erato – RCA
 Philharmonia Orchestra, London Decca – Erato – EMI – CBS-Sony
 London Symphony Orchestra (LSO) DGG
 English Chamber Orchestra (ECO) Erato – EMI Classics for  Pleasure
 London Sinfonietta Decca
 Bayerische Rundfunk Orchester München Decca – Erato
 Royal Concertgebouw Orchestra, Amsterdam Decca – EMI
 Boston Symphony Orchestra DGG
 Los Angeles Philharmonic Decca
 Montreal Symphony Decca-DGG-EMI-CBC Records-Philips
 Montreal Sinfonietta Decca
 Philadelphia Orchestra Decca
 NHK Symphony, Tokyo Decca – Sony
 Orchestre National de France Erato – Decca -Virgin Classics
 Orchestre de Paris Erato
 Nouvel Orchestre Philharmonique de Radio-France Erato
 Solistes de l'Opéra de Paris Erato
 Orchestre de la Suisse Romande Decca – Pentatone
 Orchestre de l'Opéra de Monte-Carlo Erato
 Göteborg Symphony, Sweden Sterling – Caprice – BIS
 Orchestra de la Svizzera Italiana EMI
 Norddeutsche Rundfunk Hamburg (NDR) NDR production
 Zurich Tonhalle Orchestra - Sony

Honors

 1982 – Musician of the Year, Canadian Music Council
 1982 – Great Montrealer 
 1984 – Doctor Honoris Causa, University of Montreal 
 1985 – Docteur en Musique, Laval University, Quebec 
 1988 – Canadian Music Council Medal 
 1988 – Officier de l'Ordre des Arts et des Lettres (France) 
 1991 – Honorary Citizen of the City of Philadelphia
 1994 – Diploma of Honor by the Canadian Conference of the Arts  
 1995 – Grand Officier de l'Ordre National du Québec 
 1996 – Commandeur de l'Ordre des Arts et des Lettres (France) 
 1996 – Doctorem Musicae, McGill University
 2002 – Honorary Officer of the Order of Canada 
 2003 – Prize to the best foreign Conductor 2002, Music Critic's Association of Argentina 
 2007 – Médaille d'Or de la Ville de Lausanne 
 2009 – Artistic Advisor, Shanghai Symphony Orchestra 
 2010 – Co-Director of MISA Festival, Shanghai  
 2011 – Doctor of Music, Curtis Institute, Philadelphia 
 2012 – Guangzhou Opera House (China) – Honorary Artistic Advisor
 2012 – The Musical Fund Society of Philadelphia – Tribute 
 2014 – Lifetime Achievement Award – ICMA (International Classical Music Awards), Warsaw
 2015 – Honorary Member of the Igor Stravinsky Foundation, Geneva 
 2016 – Honorary Committee Member of the Maurice Ravel Foundation, Paris 
 2016 – Koussevitzky Artist, Boston Symphony Orchestra (Tanglewood)
 2016 – Nanjing University of the Arts, China: Lifetime Honorary Professor
 2016 – Special Contribution Award,18th Shanghai International Arts Festival
 2016 – Lauréat 2016, Fondation Vaudoise pour la Culture, Lausanne 
 2017 – Royal Philharmonic Society Gold Medal
 2022 - Premio Una Vita Nella Musica from Teatro La Fenice, Venezia

Prizes
 1971 – Edison Award, Amsterdam (Tchaikowsky Piano Concerto, Martha Argerich, RPO)
 1972 – Grand Prix du Disque de l'Académie Charles Cros (Stravinsky The Soldier's Tale)
 1973 –  Grand Prix Spécial du 25ème Anniversaire de l'Académie du Disque Français (Honegger Le Roi David, Solistes de l'Opéra de Paris)
 1978 – Premio della Critica Discografica Italiana (Paganini 6 Concerti per violino,  Salvatore Accardo, LPO)
 1978 – Prix Caecilia de l'Union de la Presse Musicale Belge (Paganini 6 Concerti per violino, Salvatore Accardo, LPO)
 1981 – Grand Prix du Disque de l'Académie Charles Cros (Lalo, Caplet, Frédéric Lodéon, cello, Philharmonia Orchestra)
 1981 – Grammy nomination (Chaminade, Ibert, etc., James Galway, flute, RPO)
 1982 – Académie du Disque Français, Grand Prix du Disque (Fauré Pénélope, Orchestre Philharmonique de Monte-Carlo)
 1982 – Prix Caecilia de l'Union de la Presse Musicale Belge (Fauré Pénélope)
 1982 – Grand Prix du Disque de l'Académie Charles Cros (Fauré Pénélope)
 1982 – High Fidelity International Record Critics Award (IRCA) (Fauré Pénélope)
 1982 – Grammy nomination (Fauré Pénélope)
 1982 – Grammy nomination (Rachmaninov Piano Concerto No 2, Schumann Piano Concerto, Alicia de Larrocha, RPO)
 1982 – Grand Prix du Disque de l'Académie Charles Cros (Ravel Daphnis & Chloé, OSM)
 1982 – Prix Mondial du Disque de Montreux (Ravel Daphnis & Chloé, OSM)
 1982 – Prix Juno – Canada (Ravel Daphnis & Chloé, OSM)
 1983 – Grand Prix du Disque, Canada (Ravel Daphnis & Chloé, OSM)
 1983 – 21st Annual Japan Record Academy Award (Ravel Daphnis & Chloé, OSM)
 1983 – Disque d'Or, Canada (Ravel Album, OSM)
 1983 – Prix Félix (ADISQ) – Canada  (Ravel Album, OSM)
 1983 – Grand Prix de l'Académie du Disque Français (Saint-Saëns 5 Piano Concertos, Pascal Rogé, RPO, LPO, Philharmonia Orchestra)
 1984 – Académie du Disque Français, Prix de la Musique Française (Saint-Saëns Symphony No 3 "Organ", OSM)
 1984 – Académie du Disque Français, Mention Spéciale (Chabrier Le Roi malgré lui, Nouvel Orchestre Philharmonique de Radio-France)
 1984 – Académie du Disque Français, Grand Prix Audio-visuel de l'Europe (Honegger Symphonies No 3 and No 5, Bayerische Rundfunk Orchestra, Munich)
 1984 – Disque de Platine, Canada (Ravel Boléro, OSM)
 1984 – Académie du Disque Français, Prix Georges-Auric (Falla El amor brujo, Three- cornered Hat, OSM)
 1984 – High Fidelity International Record Critics Award (IRCA) (Falla Album, OSM)
 1984 – Prix Manuel De Falla, Granada (Falla Album, OSM) 
 1984 – Grammy nomination (Noël, Noël with Leontyne Price, OSM)
 1984 – Prix du Concerto Français de l'Académie du Disque, Paris (Ravel Piano Concertos, Pascal Rogé, OSM)
 1984 – Edison Award, Amsterdam (Ravel Piano Concertos, Pascal Rogé, OSM)
 1985 – Gramophone Record Award (Engineering and Production) (Ravel Album, OSM)
 1985 – Prix Juno – Canada (Ravel Album, OSM)
 1985 – Prix Félix (ADISQ) – Canada – Record of the year (Stravinsky The Rite of Spring + Symphonies of Winds, OSM)
 1986 – Grand Prix du Président de la République, Académie Nationale du Disque Français, (Berlioz Symphonie Fantastique, OSM)
 1986 – Stereo Review, Record of the Year Award (Chabrier Le Roi malgré lui, Nouvel Orchestre Philharmonique de Radio-France)
 1986 – Prix José Bruyr – Grand Prix du Disque de l'Académie Charles Cros (Honegger  symphonies No 2 and No 4, Bayerische Rundfunk, Munich)
 1986 – Prix Félix (ADISQ) – Canada – Record of the year (Von Suppé Eight Overtures, OSM)
 1987 – Gramophone Recording Award (Holst The Planets, OSM)
 1987 – Grammy nomination (Holst The Planets, OSM)
 1987 – Prix Juno – Canada (Holst The Planets, OSM)
 1987 – Prix Caecilia de l'Union de la Presse Musicale Belge (Roussel  Symphonies, Orchestre National de France)
 1987 – Prix Félix (ADISQ) – Canada – Record of the year (Tchaikowsky Album, OSM)
 1988 – Edison Award, Amsterdam (Holst The Planets, OSM)
 1988 – Mumm Champagne Classical Music Award (Holst The Planets, OSM)
 1988 – Grand Prix du Disque, Canada (Holst The Planets, OSM)
 1988 – Laser d'Or, Académie du Disque Français (Stravinsky Petrushka, Chant du  Rossignol, 4 Études, OSM)
 1988 – Grand Prix du Disque, Canada (Stravinsky Petrushka, etc., OSM)
 1989 – Prix Juno – Canada (Bartok Concerto for Orchestra, Music for Strings, Percussion and Celesta, OSM)
 1990 – Prix Félix (ADISQ) – (Gershwin Album, Louis Lortie, piano, OSM)
 1991 – Grand Prix de l'Académie du Disque, Japan (Debussy Album, OSM)
 1991 – Prix Juno – Canada (Debussy Album, OSM)
 1991 – Preis der Deutschen Schallplattenkritik, Germany (Debussy Pelléas & Mélisande, OSM)
 1991 – Prix Félix (ADISQ) – Canada – Best record of the year (Debussy Pelléas &  Mélisande, OSM)
 1992 – Prix Juno – Canada (Debussy Pelléas & Mélisande, OSM)
 1992 – Grammy nomination (Debussy Pelléas & Mélisande, OSM)
 1994 – Nouvelle Académie du Disque: Grand Prix Anniversaire Tchaikowsky, Paris (The Complete Nutcracker, OSM)
 1995 – Palmarès des Palmarès, Nouvelle Académie du Disque, Paris (Berlioz Les Troyens, OSM)
 1995 – Académie française du Disque Lyrique, Orphée du Prestige Lyrique, Paris (Berlioz Les Troyens, OSM)
 1995 – Grammy nomination for best Classical recording of the year (Berlioz Les Troyens, OSM)
 1995 – Prix Juno – Best classical recording of the year (Berlioz Les Troyens, OSM)
 1995 – Grammy: Best Opera Recording (Berlioz Les Troyens, OSM)
 1995 – Grammy nomination, (Mussorgsky Pictures at an exhibition, OSM)
 1996 – Grammy nomination (Rimsky-Korsakov Scheherazade, OSM)
 1996 – Prix Juno – Canadian Academy of Recording and Sciences (Shostakovich Symphonies No 5 and No 9, OSM)
 1997 – Prix Juno – Canada – Best recording of the year (Berlioz Damnation de Faust,  OSM)
 1997 – Palmarès des Palmarès, Paris: Grand Prix, Nouvelle Académie du Disque (Berlioz Damnation de Faust)
 1997 – Prix de l'Académie du Disque, Japan (Berlioz Symphonie Fantastique, OSM)
 1997 – Prix de l'Académie du Disque, Japan (Debussy Album, OSM)
 1999 – London / Decca Legends (Ravel Daphnis & Chloé, OSM)
 2000 – Prix Juno – Canada (Respighi: La Boutique Fantasque, Impressioni Brasiliane, OSM)
 2000 – Grammy:  Best Soloist with Orchestra (Bartok Piano Concerto No 3, Prokofiev Concertos No 1 and No 3, Martha Argerich, OSM)
 2002 – Prix Juno – Canada (Bruch 3 Violin Concertos, James Ehnes, OSM)
 2004 – New York Times Best Classical Discs of the year (Theodorakis "Zorba", OSM)
 2007 – Grammy nomination (Franck Symphonic Variations, Saint-Saëns Piano Concertos No 2 and No 5, Jean-Yves Thibaudet, Orchestre de la Suisse Romande OSR)
 2 Grammy Awards: 1995 and 2000.
 9 Grammy nominations: 1981, 1982, 1983, 1984, 1987, 1992, 1995, 1996, and 2007.

References

External links

Charles Dutoit biography at EMI Classics
Charles Dutoit interview, 26 March 1986
Journal d'une création – Film directed by James Dormeyer with Chantal Juillet, Charles Dutoit and André Prévost
Verbier Festival page on Charles Dutoit

1936 births
Grand Officers of the National Order of Quebec
Living people
Officers of the Order of Canada
Swiss conductors (music)
Male conductors (music)
Grammy Award winners
EMI Classics and Virgin Classics artists
People from Lausanne
Deutsche Grammophon artists
Decca Records artists
Royal Philharmonic Society Gold Medallists
Juno Award for Classical Album of the Year – Large Ensemble or Soloist(s) with Large Ensemble Accompaniment winners
Juno Award for Classical Album of the Year – Solo or Chamber Ensemble winners
21st-century conductors (music)
21st-century male musicians
Music directors of the Philadelphia Orchestra
Lausanne Conservatory alumni